"Little Ways" is a song written and recorded by American country music artist Dwight Yoakam.  It was released in June 1987 as the second single from his album Hillbilly Deluxe.  It peaked at number 8 on the Billboard Hot Country Songs chart and reached number 1 on the Canadian RPM country singles chart. This song was reprised by Dwight on his live album, Dwight Live and on the acoustic album dwightyoakamacoustic.net.

Chart performance

References

1987 singles
1987 songs
Dwight Yoakam songs
Songs written by Dwight Yoakam
Reprise Records singles
Song recordings produced by Pete Anderson